The SportPesa Super Cup is an association football competition in Africa.

Editions
 2017 SportPesa Super Cup
 2018 SportPesa Super Cup

References

International association football competitions in Africa